Pseudochazara kanishka is a species of butterfly in the family Nymphalidae. It is confined to northern Afghanistan and southern Tajikistan.

Flight period 
The species is univoltine and is on wing from June to August.

Food plants
Larvae feed on grasses.

References

 Satyrinae of the Western Palearctic - Pseudochazara kanishka

Pseudochazara
Butterflies described in 1980